Ole Buck (born 1 February 1945, in Copenhagen) is a Danish composer.

He studied the piano from the age of twelve. He also made many early attempts at orchestral composition, eventually achieving a breakthrough at the age of 20 with Calligraphy for soprano and chamber orchestra. He later studied in Aarhus, producing such works as Fioriture (1965) for flute and piano and Punctuations (1968) for orchestra. Buck's Summertrio (1968) for flute, guitar and cello indicated a new direction for Danish music, promptly dubbed the "New Simplicity".

Other significant pieces in Buck's output include the ballet Felix Luna (1970–71), Fairies (1972) for soprano and orchestra, Pastorals (1976) for orchestra, Microcosm (1992) for string quartet, Rivers and Mountains (1994) for orchestra, and Flower Ornament Music (2002) for chamber group.

External links
Biography and works list

1945 births
Living people
Danish classical composers
Danish male classical composers
20th-century classical composers
21st-century classical composers
Musicians from Copenhagen
Twelve-tone and serial composers
20th-century Danish male musicians
21st-century male musicians